Pennatula is a genus of sea pens in the family Pennatulidae. The genus contains several bioluminescent species, including Pennatula rubra, Pennatula phosphorea, and Pennatula aculeata.

References

Bioluminescent cnidarians
Pennatulidae
Octocorallia genera